Gourishankar Ray, better known as Karmaveer Gourishankar, a prominent figure amongst the makers of Modern Orissa (Odisha) as well as the savior of Odia (Oriya) language and literature, who led the Save Oriya Movement during the late nineteenth century working relentlessly for the protection and preservation of the Odia language. He was a Bengali from East Bengal from a Zamindar family at a time when an anti Oriya movement rocked the province to replace it by Bengali in the coastal, Hindi in the western and Telugu in the southern Orissa which ultimately was thwarted and Oriya was given its due place.

He was the father of the co-operative movements as well as printing & publishing crafts in Odisha. He founded the Cuttack Printing Company and Utkala Deepika, the first Odia newspaper to be printed as a weekly in 1866. Utkal Deepika owed its birth to the upsurge of nationalism playing a significant role in sociopolitical life of Orissa. He lived a life of honesty and sacrifice.

Timeline

1838: Born on 13 July. It was Aashadh Shukla Chaturdashi. At Dikshitpada, Cuttack; S/o Sadashib Prasad and Annapurna.
 1848: After completion his Primary education, in the village Pathasala and a Maqtab for Parsi, he came to Cuttack. Studied in Cuttack school, now Ravenshaw Collegiate School.
 1855: Won the Juniorship Scholarship.
 1856: Proceeded to Hoogly for College Education; Covered the distance on bullock cart and foot in 22 days.
 1858: Received proficiency certificate in English. Left Hoogly worked as a teacher at Balasore was the Teacher of Radhanath Ray, Baikuntha Nath Dey and MadhuSudan Das ; three great persons of the century in Orissa.
 1859: Came to Cuttack joined the Commissioner's Office as Money Order Agent. Founded Youngmen's Association, the first organisation to undertake public life.
 1864: Formed the Cuttack Printing Co. on a Co-operative basis.
 1865: Founder Member of the Cuttack Printing Co.
 1866: Organized public service. The volunteer Corps, to save famine stricken people. Submitted Memorandum to the Govt.(i) To alleviate the sufferings of the people during Naanka.(ii) To improve the irrigational, Communication and Railway facilities to Orissa. Published the harrowing tales of the famine in the Utkala Deepika. Founder - Editor – Printer - Manager of the Utkala Deepika which indeed heralded the modern renaissance in orissa.
 1867: Founder – Manager of the Purana Prakashika Company, also a cooperativefirm published Oriya Mahabharat, Ramayan, Puranas, Kavyas of Adi Yuga, Bhakti Yuga, Reeti Yuga. Founder – Secretary, Utkal Bhasoddipini Sabha - Worked on Language and Literature of Orissa. Published the Oriya Almanac for Universal consumption. Patronized Odisi Dance and Music. Patronised enactment of Oriya Plays.
 1868: led the save Odia movement and worked for the protection and preservantation of Odia language. An anti-oriya movement then rocked the province to replace it by Bengali in the coastal, Hindi in western, and telgu in southern Odisha.it was thwarted and oriya was given its due place.
 1869: Founder-Secy-Utkal Ullasini Sabha, a social, cultural and political organisation.
 1870: Founder-Secy of Orissa Sabha; a social, cultural, and political organisation. joined the Brahmo Samaj and became its Secretary.
 1872: joined as translator in the Dist Judge Court, Cuttack.(b)Deposited Rs 30,000 to establish the Cuttack College. It was a public collection - (The present day Revanshaw College.)
 1874: presented various pothis, to john Beams to prove the separate entity of Odia language.
 1875–76: lost his wife. Led a single life henceforth till his death (1917).
 1882: The name of orissa Sabha was substituted by the name: Utkal Sabha or Utkal Association. He was the Secy of the association up to 1915 this worked for the  unification of the oriya speaking regions, formation of a separate province of Orissa, abolition of salt law, introduction of local self Govt.such as municipalities and Dist Boards etc.
 1886: Merger of the Utkal Sabha with the Indian national Congress.
 1887: Attended the Congress session at madras.
 1892: Left Govt. service.
 1895: Attended the congress session at Poona.
 1896: Attended the congress session at Calcutta.
 1898: Became president, Governing Body, Peary Mohan Academy and continued as such till death. Extended all financial help to run the school.
 1899: Founder Member of the coronation library.
 1901: Founded a hostel in the Campus of P.M. Academy- afterwards it was named Gorishankar Chhatrabas.
 1903: Founder Member  Utkal sahitya Samaj- A premier Literary and cultural organization of the state. Edited and translated Raghuvansha in Oriya and such works of literature. Joined Utkal Sammelan founded by Madhu Sudan Das and worked actively there till the end of his life.
 1904: Founded Kayasth Boarding, Kathagada Sahi, Cuttack.
1905: Extended financial help to the Brahmana Chatrabasa, Puri.
 1906: Built a bridge at Kendrapada.
 1909: Established and built the Cuttack Town Hall. Built a restshed and planted shade – giving trees at the Khannagar Smasan I, e funeral ground. Built the stone embankment on the Kendrapara Canal. Founded and established a Mahila Training Institute for widows and destitutes. Founded and established the boys hostel.
 1911: Attended the Calcutta session of National congress.
 1913: Recipient of the certificate of Honour from the British Durbar. Founded and established the Girls' School, Dikshipara. Founded and established a Charitable Dispensary at Dikshitppara.
 1915: Attended the Congress Session at Karachi.
 1916: Received the Award of Ray Bahadur from the Govt. Commented. It is another infliction on me.
1917: His last journey – 7 March-Shukla-Chaturdashi-Phalgun.

Karmaveera Gourishankar Ray Samman
In memory of Gourishankar Ray, Utkala Cultural Association at IIT Bombay honors a prominent Odia with 'Karmaveera Gourishankar Ray Samman' each year on Utkala Dibasa (Odisha Day) for his/her outstanding contribution in different fields like arts, science, social work, entrepreneurship etc.

List of recipients 
 2016: Dr Santrupta Mishra, Entrepreneur
 2017: Mr. Abhay P. Hota, Entrepreneur
 2018: Mr. Bijay Sahoo, Entrepreneur
 2019: Dr. Amulya Sahoo, Health and social work

References

1838 births
1917 deaths
People from Odisha